The 2008 CIS Men's Soccer Championship Finals were held from the 6-9 November, 2008 at Carleton University in Ottawa, Ontario.  It consisted of 8 teams from the various conferences under the Canadian Interuniversity Sport.  The breakdown was host (Carleton), 2 from the OUA, 2 from QSSF, 2 from Canada West and 1 from the AUS.

All-Canadians
First Team(1-11) and Second Team(12-22) with school and hometown.

Nationals

Final

Tournament XI

Regional Conference play-offs

Atlantic (AUS)
Top 6 will make the play-offs with 1 and 2 seeds getting a bye to the semi-final round.  Hosted this season by Mount Allison.  Other qualifiers include UNB, St. Mary's, Dalhousie, Moncton and UPEI.

Quebec (QSSF)
Top 4 teams will make the semi-final round.  McGill, Montreal and Laval have qualified.

Ontario (OUA)
The OUA play-off will include the top 6 from each of the east and west divisions.  The top 2 will get a bye to the quarter finals with the 1st round being #6 @ #3 and #5 @ #4.  In subsequent rounds, the teams will be repositioned so that the higher seed always plays the lowest.  Laurier, York, Carleton and Toronto are the top 4 seeds.

Canada West (CW)
Top 4 teams make the semi-final round.  The final four will be hosted by the top team.
Currently UBC, Victoria and Trinity Western have clinched a spot.

Season Ranking
Top Ten rankings as published by the CIS.

External links
Official Site
Go Ravens
TWU Media Guide

U Sports men's soccer championship
Cis Mens Soccer Championship, 2008